Parajapyx isabellae is a species of two-pronged bristletail in the family Parajapygidae. It is found in Africa, Europe and Northern Asia (excluding China), North America, Oceania, South America, and Southern Asia.

Subspecies
These two subspecies belong to the species Parajapyx isabellae:
 Parajapyx isabellae azteca Silvestri, 1948
 Parajapyx isabellae isabellae (Grassi, 1886)

References

Further reading

 

Diplura
Articles created by Qbugbot
Animals described in 1886